DHB may refer to:

 2,5-Dihydroxy benzoic acid
 District health board, New Zealand
 Deer Harbor Sea Plane Base (IATA airport code), Washington, US
 German Handball Association (Deutscher Handballbund)
 German Hockey Federation (Deutscher Hockey-Bund)